Jan Glinker (born 18 January 1984) is a German former professional footballer who played as a goalkeeper.

Career
Glinker joined FSV Wacker 90 Nordhausen in the summer 2018. In October 2019, he was relegated to the club's reserve team alongside four teammates. On 25 January 2020, Glinker moved to Energie Cottbus on a deal for the rest of the season.

Personal life
On 25 July 2020, he moved to German amateur club Grün-Weiß Ahrensfelde, the club from his hometown Barnim and the club which his father, Matthias Glinker, was working at as a doctor.

Honours
 NOFV-Oberliga: 2005–06
 3. Liga: 2008–09

References

External links

1984 births
Living people
Footballers from Berlin
Association football goalkeepers
German footballers
Berliner FC Dynamo players
Hertha BSC players
1. FC Magdeburg players
1. FC Union Berlin players
FSV Wacker 90 Nordhausen players
FC Energie Cottbus players
2. Bundesliga players
3. Liga players